Dušan Stojinović (born 26 August 2000) is a Slovenian professional footballer who plays as a centre-back for Ekstraklasa club Jagiellonia Białystok.

Club career
Stojinović is a youth academy product of Bravo. He made his senior team debut on 14 October 2017 in a 3–0 defeat against Mura.

Stojinović joined Celje during 2017–18 season. In June 2019, he signed a contract extension with the club until 2022. He scored his first professional goal on 25 August 2019 in a 6–0 win against Triglav. With Celje, he won the 2019–20 Slovenian PrvaLiga season, the club's first ever national championship title.

In June 2021, Stojinović joined the Russian Premier League side Khimki on loan. On 27 January 2022, the loan was terminated early.

International career
Stojinović was a Slovenian youth international. In March 2021, he was included in the under-21 squad for the 2021 UEFA European Under-21 Championship.

Career statistics

Honours
Celje
Slovenian PrvaLiga: 2019–20

References

External links
 

2000 births
Living people
Footballers from Ljubljana
Association football defenders
Slovenian footballers
Slovenia youth international footballers
Slovenia under-21 international footballers
NK Bravo players
NK Celje players
FC Khimki players
Jagiellonia Białystok players
Slovenian Second League players
Slovenian PrvaLiga players
Russian Premier League players

Slovenian expatriate footballers
Expatriate footballers in Russia
Slovenian expatriate sportspeople in Russia
Expatriate footballers in Poland
Slovenian expatriate sportspeople in Poland